Nanna collinsii is a moth of the subfamily Arctiinae. It was described by Lars Kühne in 2007. It is found in the Democratic Republic of the Congo and Kenya.

References

 

Lithosiini
Moths described in 2007